Nemfidius was Patriarch of Provence around 700 CE, during the time of Pepin of Herstal (687-714). He was succeeded by Antenor. Nemfidius issued coins, some of which have reached us.

Notes

Provence